Maurice Bienvenu Jean Paul Trintignant (30 October 1917 – 13 February 2005) was a motor racing driver and vintner from France. He competed in the Formula One World Championship for fourteen years, between 1950 and 1964, one of the longest careers in the early years of Formula One. During this time he also competed in sports car racing, including winning the 1954 24 Hours of Le Mans race. Following his retirement from the track Trintignant concentrated on the wine trade.

Maurice Trintignant was the brother of Bugatti race car driver Louis Trintignant — who was killed in 1933, in practice, at Péronne, Picardy — and the uncle of renowned French film actor Jean-Louis Trintignant.

Racing career
He began racing in 1938, and won the 1939 Grand Prix des Frontières, but his career was interrupted by the Second World War, during which his own Bugatti was stored in a barn. When he rebuilt it for an event of 1945, the Coupé de la Liberation, he overlooked a clogged fuel filter, which caused him to drop out of the race. It transpired that the filter was plugged with rat droppings, earning him the unenviable nickname Le Petoulet, "the rat-droppings man".

By 1950 Le Petoulet was successful enough to be offered a works drive for the Gordini team, in the newly formed Formula One World Championship racing series. He competed in Formula One every year until his retirement after the 1964 season. During this long career Trintignant scored two victories, both at the Monaco Grand Prix, in 1955 and 1958. 1954 and 1955 were his best Championship years and he finished fourth in the Drivers' Championship in both.

During the course of his career, Trintignant drove a huge variety of cars, for many different teams: both works and privateer. Unusually, at the 1955 Argentine Grand Prix Trintignant shared both second and third places, a product of the Scuderia Ferrari policy of passing cars to their top drivers, should their original car break down. In 1956 he drove the Bugatti Type 251 in the French Grand Prix, becoming the last driver to represent the famed marque at a Grand Prix race. Even in his final season, driving his own BRM P57, he scored points, taking fifth place at the 1964 German Grand Prix on the intimidating Nürburgring.
Following his retirement from racing, Maurice Trintignant returned to a quiet life as a wine-grower (naming his vintage Le Petoulet), near the town of Vergèze, in the Languedoc-Roussillon wine growing region.

Trintignant competed in the 2000 Historic Grand Prix of Monaco, reunited with the Cooper T45 he had driven to victory there in 1958.

Trintignant died, aged 87, in 2005.

Major career wins
Rheinland-Pfalz Preis – 1950 
Mont Ventoux Hill Climb – 1949, 1960, 1964
Buenos Aires Grand Prix – 1954, 1960
Swedish Grand Prix – 1956 
RAC Tourist Trophy – 1954
Circuit des Nations – 1950
Moroccan Grand Prix – 1956
Grand Prix Avignon – 1947
Albi Grand Prix – 1951
Grand Prix de Caen – 1952, 1954
Grand Prix de Cadours – 1952, 1953
Pau Grand Prix – 1958, 1959 (F2), 1962 (F1)
Grand Prix de Rouen-les-Essarts – 1954
Grand Prix de Roubaix – 1952
Grand Prix des Frontières – 1938, 1939, 1953
2 hours of Dakar – 1956
12 hours of Hyères – 1954
10 hours of Messina – 1955
Monaco Grand Prix – 1955, 1958
24 Hours of Le Mans – 1953, 1954

Racing record

Complete Formula One World Championship results
(key) (Races in bold indicate pole position) (Races in italics indicate fastest lap)

* Indicates shared drive with Harry Schell
† Indicates shared drives with José Froilán González and Giuseppe Farina (2nd place) & Giuseppe Farina and Umberto Maglioli (3rd place)
‡ Indicates shared drive with Peter Collins

Complete 24 Hours of Le Mans results

Complete 12 Hours of Sebring results

Complete British Saloon Car Championship results
(key) (Races in bold indicate pole position; races in italics indicate fastest lap.)

Trivia
 He was awarded the Légion d’Honneur in 1960
 Was the mayor of Vergèze between 1958 and 1964.
 Was married to Louise on 10 December 1938
 Took over his father's vineyard
 On 10 October 2010 a bronze statue of a Bugatti Type 51 was unveiled in Sainte-Cécile-les-Vignes in his honour

Notes

References

External links
Mattijs Diepraam, Colombo's flawed brilliance, 8W, October 1998.

French racing drivers
French Formula One drivers
Formula One race winners
Gordini Formula One drivers
Ecurie Rosier Formula One drivers
Ferrari Formula One drivers
Vanwall Formula One drivers
Bugatti Formula One drivers
Rob Walker Racing Team Formula One drivers
BRM Formula One drivers
Scuderia Centro Sud Formula One drivers
Aston Martin Formula One drivers
Reg Parnell Racing Formula One drivers
Scuderia Serenissima Formula One drivers
24 Hours of Le Mans drivers
24 Hours of Le Mans winning drivers
12 Hours of Reims drivers
World Sportscar Championship drivers
Sportspeople from Vaucluse
1917 births
2005 deaths
Grand Prix drivers
Porsche Motorsports drivers